The Borkou-Ennedi-Tibesti (BET) was until 2008 one of the then 18 regions of Chad, its capital being Faya-Largeau. It comprised the former Borkou-Ennedi-Tibesti Prefecture. Most of the region was part of the Sahara desert.

In 2008, this region was split into three new regions: Borkou Region, Ennedi Region, and Tibesti Region.

Subdivisions
The region of Borkou-Ennedi-Tibesti was formerly divided into 4 departments:

Demography

The region had a population of 70,603 inhabitants in 1993, of whom 59,479 are sedentary and 11,124 nomad. In 2009, the BET counted 286,986 inhabitants.

The main ethnico-linguistic groups are the Daza (55.96%), the Teda (22.63%), the Zaghawa (10.17%) and the Arabs (2.57%).

Natural history
There is a variety of fauna and flora in this region. Previously the Chadian wild dog (Lycaon pictus sharicus) had populations in this region, but they are now regarded as extirpated from the area, due to activities of humans as well as desertification, a phenomenon associated with the expanding human population.

References

Regions of Chad